Alone is an American survival competition series on History. It follows the self-documented daily struggles of 10 individuals (seven paired teams in season 4) as they survive alone in the wilderness for as long as possible using a limited amount of survival equipment. With the exception of medical check-ins, the participants are isolated from each other and all other humans. They may "tap out" at any time, or be removed due to failing a medical check-in. The contestant who remains the longest wins a grand prize of $500,000 (increasing to $1 million in season 7). The seasons have been filmed across a range of remote locations, usually on Indigenous-controlled lands, including northern Vancouver Island, British Columbia, Nahuel Huapi National Park in Argentine, Patagonia, Northern Mongolia, Great Slave Lake in the Northwest Territories, and Chilko Lake in interior British Columbia.

The series premiered on June 18, 2015. On August 19, before the finale of season 1, it was announced that the series had been renewed for a second season, which would begin production in the fall of 2015 on Vancouver Island, Canada. Season 2 premiered on April 21, 2016. Season 3 was filmed in the second quarter of 2016 in Patagonia, Argentina and premiered on December 8. One day before the season 3 premiere, History announced that casting had begun for season 4. Season 4 was set in Northern Vancouver Island with a team dynamic and premiered on June 8, 2017. Season 5 was set in Northern Mongolia and allowed losers from previous seasons to return and compete.  It premiered on June 14, 2018. Season 6 premiered on June 6, 2019 and featured ten all-new contestants between the ages of 31 and 55. It was set just south of the Arctic Circle on a lake in the Northwest Territories of Canada.

The seventh season premiered on June 11, 2020. Participants attempted to survive for 100 days in the Arctic in order to win a $1 million prize.

A spin-off series, Alone: The Beast, premiered on January 30, 2020. In this series, three people attempt to survive in the wild for 30 days, with no tools or supplies except for their own clothing and a freshly killed animal. One group, in the Arctic, was provided with a 1,000-pound bull moose; two other groups were sent separately to the swamps of Louisiana and given an alligator and wild boar, respectively.

In 2022, two new spin-off series were ordered. Alone: Frozen drops six former contestants on Labrador’s east coast in the dead of winter, where they must survive for a set 50 days. Alone: The Skills Challenge, brings back three former contestants who put their bushcraft skills to the test in head-to-head building competitions. Contestants are provided basic tools and can only use the natural resources around them. Both shows aired at the beginning of August after Season 9.

Additionally, a number of foreign versions have been produced.

Format and rules

General rules in all seasons
Contestants are dropped off in a remote wilderness area, far enough apart to ensure that they will not come in contact with one another. The process begins in mid- to late autumn; this adds time pressure to the survival experience as the approaching winter causes temperatures to drop and food to become scarce. Although terrains may differ in each contestant's location, the drop-off zones are assessed in advance to ensure a similar distribution of local resources is available to each contestant.

Contestants each select 10 items of survival gear from a pre-approved list of 40, and are issued a kit of standard equipment, clothing and first aid/emergency supplies. They are also given a set of cameras to document their daily experiences and emotions. Attempting to live in the wild for as long as possible, the contestants must find food, build shelters, and endure deep isolation, physical deprivation and psychological stress.

Contestants who wish to withdraw from the competition for any reason (referred to as "tapping out") may signal a rescue crew using a provided satellite telephone. In addition, medical professionals conduct periodic health checks on the contestants and may, at their discretion, disqualify and evacuate anyone they feel is unable to continue participating safely. The last remaining contestant wins a $500,000 cash prize. Contestants are warned that the show might last for up to a year.

Pairs format (Season 4)
Season 4 was also filmed in Northern Vancouver Island but included a team dynamic. Fourteen contestants, consisting of seven family-member pairs, were individually dropped off in remote areas of Northern Vancouver Island. The two members of each team chose 10 items of survival gear to be equally divided between them. If either member tapped out or was medically evacuated, his/her partner was disqualified as well. The last remaining team won the $500,000 prize.

Season 5
Season 5 contestants were selected from non-winning contestants from Seasons 1 through 4. The rules were otherwise similar to Seasons 1 through 3.

Season 7
For Season 7, the contestants attempted to survive for 100 days in order to win a grand prize of $1 million. In an "Alone: Tales from the Arctic" segment at the end of each episode, host Colby Donaldson spoke post-season to the contestants featured in that episode about what occurred, accompanied by "never before seen footage."

Season 8
Season 8 was filmed in fall 2020 on the shores of Chilko Lake, British Columbia, a high-altitude glacial-fed lake on the dry eastern side of the Coast Mountains. The season reverts to the original format of the show, with the last person standing (regardless of time frame) declared the winner and awarded $500,000.

Season 9
Season 9 was filmed in fall 2021 and set in harsh weather conditions of Northeastern Labrador. The season will feature two new digital content series: “The Ride Back”, which will focus on the emotions of the participants ahead of tapping out, and “Shelter From the Storm”, an in-depth look at the ingenious shelters the participants build. Also, for the first time, the participants have to deal with a prey-stalking predator, the polar bear.

Reception 
The series received positive reviews in its first season and outstanding reviews for its third season, and earned 2.5 million total viewers, placing it in the top three new nonfictional cable series of 2015.

Episodes

Series overview

Season 1 (2015)

The first season of Alone premiered on June 18, 2015 and concluded on August 27, with 11 episodes. Alan Kay won the first season after surviving for 56 days.

Season 2 (2016)
Season 2 began on April 21, 2016. The season had 13 one-hour episodes, including the reunion episode and the first "Episode 0", which shows how the 10 contestants (pared down from 20) are chosen based on survival skills (i.e. ability to make a fire without a starter, basic animal prep, shelter), on-camera personality, and how readily they learn the camera equipment. This was the first season to include women as well as men. The winner, David McIntyre, lost around 20 pounds in the first weeks alone. Mike Lowe made his time on Alone innovative and made a sink, boat, football game, and many more objects.

Location

The second season was also set on Vancouver Island, in Quatsino Territory, located near Port Hardy, British Columbia.

Contestants

Season 3 (2016–17)
The third season premiered on December 8, 2016.  The winner, Zachary Fowler, had lost 70 lbs (a third of his starting body weight) before the end of his stay. Season 3 marked the first time a contestant was pulled for medical reasons; the first was fourth place, Dave Nessia, who was pulled out when, due to inadequate caloric intake, his systolic pressure barely exceeded his diastolic pressure (80/60 mmHg), putting him in danger of death due to inadequate perfusion of the internal organs. He had been in starvation mode for so long, even though he left with 33 halves of dried fish still ready to eat, he was surviving with the thought of only eating half a fish every other day. The second, and the person who stayed the second-longest, Carleigh Fairchild, was pulled out because, at 101 lbs/45.8 kg, she had lost nearly 30% of her starting body weight and had a BMI of 16.8. Participants are automatically "pulled" at a BMI of 17 or less.

Location

The third season was set in Patagonia, Argentina, in South America. The contestants were spread across multiple lakes in the foothills of the Andes mountain range. Unlike in seasons 1 and 2, which were located on the Pacific Ocean, season 3's food resources were mostly limited to brook and rainbow trout, forage, small birds, and the possibility of wild boar. Contestants also were at a disadvantage because they had no access to the flotsam and jetsam that washes up on the Pacific Coast. They also had no salt source.

The weather in Patagonia is comparable to that of Vancouver Island, with rainfall averaging 78 inches a year. However, unlike Vancouver Island, snowfall is extremely common in the winter.

Predators in Patagonia include wild boar and puma.

Contestants

Season 4 (2017)
Officially titled "Alone: Lost & Found", the fourth season premiered on June 8, 2017. For this season, for the first time participants were in pairs (2) of family members (brother/brother, husband/wife, father/son), with seven teams scattered throughout the island. The prize was still $500,000, which would be split between the two. One member was dropped in the traditional manner, along a beach head with the idea that they'd stay in the relative area for their duration, while the second member was dropped about 10 miles out with only a compass and bearing and needed to hike their way to base camp. Supply items were still limited to 10 chosen survival tools total, that were split between team members until reconnecting. If one member decided to tap out an any time, the partner was also eliminated. Three teams never met up before tapping out, and it took eight days for the first team to come together. Pete Brockdorff experienced a medical emergency during his and his son's standard tap-out. It was severe chest pains brought on by the acid reflux he developed as a result of the lack of food. Jim and Ted Baird won the season after lasting 75 days.

Location

The fourth season was again set on Vancouver Island, in Quatsino Territory, located near Port Hardy, British Columbia. Teams were set further apart than normal this season, due to the 10 mile radius hike required to meet up at their rendezvous point.

Contestants

Season 5 (2018) 
Officially titled "Alone: Redemption", Season 5 premiered on June 14, 2018. The 10 contestants are non-winners selected from the previous 4 seasons of Alone.

Location 

The fifth season was set in Northern Mongolia in Asia. The series was filmed in Khonin Nuga near the city of Züünkharaa, Selenge aimag. "Khonin Nuga" is a valley located close to the Khentii Mountains of Northern Mongolia, one of the country's unique and still largely untouched places.

Contestants

Season 6 (2019) 
Officially titled "Alone: The Arctic", Season 6 premiered on June 6, 2019.

Location 

Contestants

Season 7 (2020) 
Officially titled "Alone: Million Dollar Challenge", Season 7 premiered on June 11, 2020. Unlike the previous seasons, instead of trying to outlast all of their competitors, the ultimate goal for the participants was to survive for 100 days on their own, which meant that there was a possibility of multiple winners—or conversely, no winners at all. At the end of each episode host Colby Donaldson lets the contestants comment on the episode which is accompanied by "never before seen footage."

Location 
The seventh season is again set along the shore of the east arm of Great Slave Lake in the Northwest Territories of Canada. Drop off (Day 1) was on September 18, 2019.

Contestants

Season 8 (2021) 
Officially titled "Alone: Grizzly Mountain", Season 8 premiered on June 3, 2021. The season reverts to the original format of the show, with the last person standing declared the winner and awarded $500,000. At the end of most episodes in which a contestant taps out, Season 6 contestant and fifth-place finisher Nikki van Schyndel (a survival expert and first responder) conducts a short exit interview at base camp a few days after the tap out.

Location 

The eighth season is set along the shores of high-elevation Chilko Lake (Tŝilhqox Biny), British Columbia, a 40-mile long remote glacial lake on the dry eastern side of the Coast Mountains. The lake's surface is at over 3800 ft above sea level, making Season 8 the first Alpine season of Alone, being over 1000 ft higher in elevation than the next-highest season, Season 3, in Patagonia. Drop off (Day 1) was on September 18, 2020.

Contestants

Season 9 (2022) 
Season 9 premiered on May 26, 2022, and was filmed in the Nunatsiavut region of northern Labrador, eastern Canada.

Location
Season 9 participants were dropped in September 2021 along the lower reaches of the Big River, Labrador, Canada, 35 km (21 mi) south of the nearest community of Makkovik. The river is surrounded by dense spruce-fir boreal forest dotted by muskeg bogs of peat and Labrador Tea. The surrounding area is abundant in wildlife including Brook Trout, Canadian Beaver, American Black Bear, Spruce Grouse, and Caribou, with the river visited by Harbor Seals in fall. Drop off (Day 1) was on September 18, 2021.

Contestants

International versions
In January 2017, a Danish version of the series premiered with the title Alone in the Wilderness on DR3. It featured ten contestants and was filmed in northern Norway in the fall of 2016. Participants chose 12 items from a list of 18. The winner of the Danish version gains nothing but the honor. Since 2017, four more seasons of Alone in the Wilderness have been produced.

In fall 2017, a Norwegian version aired with 10 contestants spread around a lake with fish. It was located near the tree line, so the collection of small birch trees left few land resources for contestants.

In early 2022, an Australian version was announced by SBS following the success of the American version on SBS On Demand. Titled Alone Australia, the series will be produced by ITV Studios Australia and air in 2023. The show is currently casting for contestants. The American version of the show also airs in Australia via Foxtel on A&E. An Alone pop-up channel began broadcasting on Foxtel on 24 February 2023 and ceased broadcasting on 20 March 2023.

In August 2022, a British version was announced by Channel 4; the series will be produced by The Garden.

See also
 Survivorman
 Wilderness survival

References

External links
 

History (American TV channel) original programming
Works about survival skills
2015 American television series debuts
English-language television shows
2010s American reality television series
2020s American reality television series
Television shows filmed in British Columbia
Television shows filmed in Argentina
Television shows filmed in Mongolia
Television shows filmed in the Northwest Territories
Television shows filmed in Newfoundland and Labrador
Television series by ITV Studios
Reality competition television series